"Michael (the Lover)" is a soul song originally performed by American Chicago soul group the C.O.D.'s.

The song was written by the group's lead singer Larry Brownlee who was murdered in 1978. It was released as a single on Kellmac Records in the United States and Stateside in the United Kingdom and made it to number 5 on the Hot Rhythm & Blues Singles chart in 1965.  The song was produced by Leon Singleton and arranged by Pete Matthews.

The song was later remade by the Mad Lads, appearing on their 1966 album The Mad Lads In Action (Volt 414), and by the Northern soul Geno Washington & the Ram Jam Band (Piccadilly 7N 35359).  Washington's version reached #39 on the UK charts.  The 1980 song "Geno", a tribute to Washington and his band, notes "You were Michael the lover, the fighter that won".

Geno Washington & the Ram Jam Band version

Their version got to #39 in February 1967.  It appeared on the Marble Arch compilation album, Stars of 67  which also featured "Puppet on a String" by Sandie Shaw and "Universal Soldier" by Donovan.

Other versions by Geno Washington & the Ram Jam Band includes a live version appears on Hand Clappin, Foot Stompin, Funky-Butt ... Live! album.  An unreleased version recorded by Geno Washington & the Ram Jam Band in 1968 appears on the Holdin' On With Geno Washington & The Ram Jam Band EP which was released on the Acid Jazz label in 2013.

Notes

References

1965 singles
1965 songs
Geno Washington & the Ram Jam Band songs
Pye Records singles